Liberty Bell refers to one of two replicas in Portland, Oregon, United States, of the original Liberty Bell in Philadelphia. The first replica was purchased in 1962, and installed in the rotunda of City Hall in 1964. On November 21, 1970, it was destroyed in a bomb blast that also damaged the building's east portico. The second replica was installed outside of City Hall soon after the blast (c. 1972) with funds from private donations. It was dedicated on November 6, 1975. The bell is listed as a state veterans memorial by the Oregon Department of Veterans' Affairs.

History
Portland has had two replicas of Philadelphia's original Liberty Bell. The first replica was purchased in 1962 for $8,000. It was constructed at the McShane Bell Foundry in Baltimore and received a 25-year guarantee against breakage. The bell arrived in Portland in June 1963, with a damaged base and beam since the sculpture had slipped off its supports. Repairs were made before the replica was paraded through the city on a flatbed truck, then put into storage until Independence Day, when the bell was presented to the city. It was publicly rung for the first time during holiday celebrations and installed in City Hall's rotunda on May 5, 1964.

On November 21, 1970, a dynamite bomb that had been placed beneath the bell detonated, damaging City Hall's east portico columns, shattering windows, and destroying the replica. No one was injured, but "shards of bell went everywhere through the main portico". The crime remains unsolved; no one claimed responsibility or was prosecuted for the blast. In 1993, The Oregonian said: "Wild, highly vocal speculation blamed the blast on either left-wing or right-wing terrorists, depending, of course, on the accusers' own political persuasions. Others guessed it was a monumental prank that careened out of control."

Portland's second replica is located outside of City Hall's east portico, near the intersection of Southwest Fourth and Madison streets and across from Terry Schrunk Plaza. Private donations totaling $8,000 allowed a new bell to be purchased for $6,000 and installed not long after the blast (c. 1972). The bell has also been attributed as a gift from Philadelphia residents to Portland school children. It was dedicated on November 6, 1975. The replica was surveyed and considered "treatment needed" by the Smithsonian Institution's "Save Outdoor Sculpture!" program in October 1993. The Oregon Department of Veterans' Affairs lists the bell as one of the state's veterans memorials.

Description and reception

It is attached to a horizontal beam that is supported by two V-shaped beams. The west side displays the inscription . Raised lettering along the top of the bell reads . The founder's mark also appears. Smithsonian categorizes the sculpture as allegorical for symbolizing liberty.

The bell has been included in published walking tours of Portland.

See also

 1963 in art
 1972 in art
 Liberty Bell (Oregon State Capitol), Salem

References

External links

 
 City of Portland's Liberty Bell Replica, Waymarking
 Wikipedia-Derived Fact of the Day by Sarah Mirk (October 20, 2009), The Portland Mercury

1963 establishments in Oregon
1963 sculptures
1972 establishments in Oregon
1972 sculptures
Allegorical sculptures in Oregon
Copper sculptures in Oregon
Demolished buildings and structures in Oregon
Destroyed sculptures
Individual bells in the United States
Liberty symbols
Military monuments and memorials in the United States
Monuments and memorials in Portland, Oregon
Outdoor sculptures in Portland, Oregon
Southwest Portland, Oregon
Vandalized works of art in Oregon